Nathanael Lynch was an Irish Anglican priest in the first half of the 17th century.

Lynch was educated at Trinity College, Dublin. He was a Prebendary of Kilmanagh in Kilkenny Cathedral  and Archdeacon of Waterford from 1629 until his resignation in 1634.

References

17th-century Irish Anglican priests
Archdeacons of Waterford
Alumni of Trinity College Dublin